The 2020 South and Central American Men's Handball Championship was the first edition of the South and Central American Men's Handball Championship, held from 21 to 25 January 2020 in Brazil. It acted as the South and Central American qualifying tournament for the 2021 World Men's Handball Championship in Egypt.

The competition consisted in a round-robin of 6 national teams playing against them in a five days row. Argentina won the tournament.

Standings

Results
All times are local (UTC−3).

All-star team
The all-star team was announced on 7 February 2020. Ignacio Pizarro was the tournament top-scorer with 35 goals.

References

South and Central American Men's Handball Championship
South and Central American Men's Handball Championship
South and Central American Men's Handball Championship
South and Central American Men's Handball Championship
South and Central American Men's Handball Championship